The Japan Academy (Japanese: 日本学士院, Nihon Gakushiin) is an honorary organisation and science academy founded in 1879 to bring together leading Japanese scholars with distinguished records of scientific achievements. The Academy is currently an extraordinary organ of the Ministry of Education, Culture, Sports, Science and Technology with its headquarters located in Taito, Tokyo, Japan. Election to the Academy is considered the highest distinction a scholar can achieve, and members enjoy life tenure and an annual monetary stipend.

History

In 1973, Meiroku-sha (Meairoku Society) was founded. The main people of Meiroku-sha involved in Meiroku-sha were from Kaiseijo (later transformed into University of Tokyo and so on) and Keio Gijuku (Keio University).

In an effort to replicate the institutional landscape found in many Western nations, the leaders of the Meiji government sought to create a national academy of scholars and scientists modelled to the British Royal Society. 

In 1879, Nishi Amane was made the head of what was then called the Tokyo Academy.

In 1906 it was renamed the Imperial Academy, and in 1947 it was renamed the Japan Academy.

Prizes awarded
The Imperial Prize and Japan Academy Prize are awarded to persons who have achieved notable research landmarks or who have authored outstanding academic papers or books. One of the Academy's most important functions involves conferring these prizes, which have been awarded annually since 1911.  Since 1949, these prize award ceremonies have been graced by the presence of HIM the Emperor of Japan; and since 1990, both the Emperor and Empress have attended.

Japan Academy Prize
From 1911 until 1947, the academy annually conferred the Imperial Prize of the Japan Academy (Gakushiin Onshi Shō).  Amongst past winners are Hideyo Noguchi (1915) and Tasuku Honjo (1996).  After 1947, the name of the award was changed to Japan Academy Prize (Gakushiin Shō).

Duke of Edinburgh Prize
In 1987, HRH Prince Philip, Duke of Edinburgh suggested that the Academy take responsibility for conferring the biennial Duke of Edinburgh Prize to a Japanese scientist with outstanding achievements in the area of wildlife protection and species preservation. In addition to this specific award, some 75 prizes and medals are associated with The Duke of Edinburgh.

Japan Academy Medal
Since 2004, the Academy has annually conferred the Japan Academy Medal.

Timeline
The early-Meiji era Tokyo Academy was institutionally re-organized into  an Imperial Academy in 1906; and this institution was renamed the Japan Academy in 1947:
 1879 	The Tokyo Academy established; Tokyo Academy Magazine (Vol. 1, No. 1).
 1890 	Tokyo Academy Statute promulgated.
 1895 	Honorary Membership established.
 1906 	Statute of the Imperial Academy promulgated; joined Internationale Assoziation der Akademien (IAA).
 1911 	Imperial Prize and Imperial Academy Prize established; first award ceremony.
 1912 	Proceedings of the Imperial Academy (Vol. 1, No. 1).
 1919 	Imperial Academy joined Union Académique Internationale (UAI).
 1925 	Statute of the Imperial Academy amended (increased membership).
 1942 	Transactions of the Imperial Academy (Vol. 1, No. 1).
 1947 	Imperial Academy renamed Japan Academy.
 1949 	Japan Academy institutionally linked to Science Council of Japan.
 1956 	Law of the Japan Academy promulgated; Japan Academy de-linked from Science Council of Japan.
 1971 	Exchange program with foreign academies started.
 1983 	Visiting program of Honorary Members started.
 1984 	First public lecture meeting was held.
 1987 	Duke of Edinburgh Prize was adopted.
 2004 	Japan Academy Medal established.

President

President of the Tokyo Academy

President of the Imperial Academy

President of the Japan Academy

Counterparts in other countries
 Royal Society of London
 British Academy
 Romanian Academy
 Hungarian Academy of Sciences
 Royal Swedish Academy of Sciences
 Bulgarian Academy of Sciences
 Academy of Sciences, Institute of France
 Royal Society of Canada
 National Academy of Sciences of the Republic of Korea
 Union of the German Academies of Sciences and Humanities

Notes

References
 Kita, Atsushi. (2005).  Dr. Noguchi's Journey: A Life of Medical Search and Discovery (tr., Peter Durfee). Tokyo: Kodansha.   (cloth)

External links 
 

 
Japan
Extraordinary organs (Japan)
Government agencies established in 1879
Ueno Park